Gunnila Märta Louise Bernadotte, Countess of Wisborg (née Countess Wachtmeister af Johannishus; 12 May 1923 – 12 September 2016) was a Swedish and Luxembourgish  noblewoman.

Early life
The daughter of Count Nils Claes Ludvig Wachtmeister af Johannishus (1891–1960) and Baroness Märta Ebba Carolina de Geer af Leufsta (1896–1976).

First marriage
She was first married in 1942 to Carl-Herman Albert Gerhard Bussler (1918–1981), son of Karl-Gerhard Bussler and Countess Catharina Stenbock. The couple had four children together:
Louise (1943–1986) 
Catharina (1946–1946) 
Madeleine (b. 1948) 
Carl-Fredrik "Fred" (b. 1951)

Second marriage
Following her first husband's death, on 29 September 1988, in Copenhagen she became the second wife of Count Carl Johan Bernadotte of Wisborg, a widower and the youngest son of King Gustaf VI Adolf and Princess Margaret of Connaught. Via her marriage to Bernadotte she became nobility in Luxembourg and was addressed there as Princess Bernadotte and Countess of Wisborg due to title granted to her husband by Charlotte, Grand Duchess of Luxembourg.

In 2010, Bernadotte gifted her with the house in Båstad, built many years earlier for himself and his first wife, Kerstin Wijkmark. He died in 2012.

Ancestry

References

External links

1923 births
2016 deaths
Gunnila
Swedish countesses
Burials at Kungliga begravningsplatsen